Eimi may refer to:

 EIMI, a 1933 book by E. E. Cummings about a 1931 trip to the Soviet Union
 eimì, an Ancient Greek verbs meaning "to be"
 Kuwaiti Persian (or Eimi), an endangered language spoken in Kuwait
 Eimi Kuroda (born 1988), Japanese fashion model
 , Japanese singer and voice actress
 , Japanese writer
 , Japanese singer and model
 , a character in Saint Tail

Japanese feminine given names